Slobodan Savić (born in 1964) is a Serbian author, theatre critic, writer and journalist.

Biography

He graduated Literature and Theory of Literature from the University of Belgrade Faculty of Philology. His reviews and short prose works were published in Student, Vidici, Književna reč, Književne novine, Književni list, literary almanacs, emitted in radio and television programmes; his columns were published in leading journals and periodicals in the country. He has been an Editor and Editor in Chief of cultural programme on Radio Belgrade 2 for many years, and the author and mediator of the cult talk show Radio parliament (that was cancelled for 'political incorrectness' in 1995). He was Editor of literary journal Znak, literary Editor of magazine Profil, columnist and Editor of culture of a daily papers Glas javnosti. He was awarded by a journal Vidici and the winner of Annual award of Radio Television Belgrade.
He is a screenwriter and author of numerous documentary TV films and series. The Editor in Department of Cultural and Artistic programme on Serbian Radio Television (Serbian Broadcasting Corporation, Belgrade). Initiator and author of the TV series Reading of the Theater. He is a member of the Association of Theatre Critics of Serbia (ITCA). He was born at Požarevac, grew up at Kostolac, lives and works in Belgrade for many years.

Awards
 Sterijino pozorje, Sterija Award for theater criticism in 2021, Novi Sad, 2021.

Works
 Kratka svetska priča (Short Stories Worldwide), selection of stories, publisher Braničevo, Požarevac, 1989),
 Zbog njih su mnogi gubili glavu (Many were crazy about them), publisher Evro, Belgrade, 2000,
 Istočno i zapadno od raja (East and West from Eden), publisher Laguna, Belgrade, 2007,
 Biljana Srbljanović, porodične i druge priče (Biljana Srbljanovic, family and other tales), publisher Knjaževsko-srpski teatar, City of Kragujevac, 2008.

Selection from TV series Reading of the Theater

TV series Reading of the Theater
 Novi pozorišni poredak (35 years of BITEF)
 Izgon iz komunističkog raja (Aleksandar Popović)
 Režija i angažman (Thomas Ostermeier)
 Amadeus režije (Jagoš Marković)
 Pozorište kao utočište (Goran Marković)
 Kroz istoriju i pozorište Srbije
 Porodične i druge priče, (Biljana Srbljanović)
 Život nije bajka (Milena Marković)
 Pozorište u dosluhu s vremenom (Egon Savin)
 Pozorište kao ogledalo istorije (Vida Ognjenović)
 Nepodnošljiva lakoća režije (Jerzy Mencl)

Gallery

References

External links

Radio Television Belgrade
Laguna
Knjaževsko-srpski teatar

1964 births
Living people
Writers from Požarevac
Serbian non-fiction writers
Serbian literary critics
Literary critics of Serbian
Serbian theatre critics
Serbian screenwriters
Male screenwriters
Serbian television journalists
University of Belgrade Faculty of Philology alumni